Joana Arranz Valiño is a Spanish football defender who last played for SD San Ignacio.

Career
Arranz started playing at CD Ugao before joining Athletic Bilbao in Spain's Primera División.

References

External links
Profile at Txapeldunak.com 

1988 births
Living people
Spanish women's footballers
Footballers from the Basque Country (autonomous community)
Primera División (women) players
Athletic Club Femenino players
Sportspeople from Álava
Oiartzun KE players
Women's association football defenders
Athletic Club Femenino B players